Kaiser (also Kaizar; born 18 February 1961) is a Burmese singer-songwriter who was most popular in the late 1970s and mid-1980s. The ethnic Rakhine singer was arguably the most successful male singer in Myanmar in the early 1980s. His nonthreatening rockabilly songs were popular with the young and the old alike. He collaborated with leading songwriters of the day like Saw Bwe Mhu, Naing Myanmar, Soe Lwin Lwin, Maung Maung Zan, and Thukhamein Hlaing. His most successful songs were written by Naing Myanmar and Saw Bwe Mhu.

Kaiser was also a successful songwriter, who penned many commercially successful songs for top singers of the day, including May Sweet, and Maykhala, his wife in the mid-1980s. Most of his songs were of his own creation although he also sampled and covered Western rock-and-roll hits, most notably those by the Beatles. He calls the Kissapanadi Hlaing Than album whose title track was about the Kaladan River in Rakhine State, his most satisfying track. He co-wrote the song with Maung Maung Zan, also an ethnic Rakhine.

Discography
In a 2000 interview, he said he had released 20 albums and over 200 songs over his career.

Albums
 Akyeetan Ei Ahteekyan Ahtotpatti
 A Lwan
 A Nan Pan
 Ma No Ba Zay Ne Moe Ye
 Nauk Ta Khauk Lauk Taw Htat Pyaw Ba
 Thachin-Shin-Go Kyinna-Ba
 Kissapanadi Hlaing Than
 Tu-Hna-Ko Taingpyi (with May Sweet)
 Einmet Mya Go Tihtwinthu
 Chan Le Chan De Lwan Le Lwan De
 Myintmo Taung Tetthama
 Maung Dewutsaya
 Achit Hso Thi Mha
 Myanmar Pyi Go Lwan De
 Lwan Leippya Ye Ko-Paing Thanzin
 Naing Ngan Kyaw
 Gita Yazawin (1 & 2)
 Yazawin Twin Me Moe
 Kissapanadi Hlaing Than (Karaoke)
 Shwe Yadu A-Chit (Karaoke)
 Thachin-Shin-Ye Khayizin (Live Show 01)
 Maung Nge Phaw Go Lwan De Nya
 A-Lwan-Byay 2

Songs written for others
 Ma-No-Ba-Zay-Ne Moe Ye for May Sweet
 Ta-Chein-Don-Ga Tekkatho for Maykhala

References

1961 births
20th-century Burmese male singers
Burmese singer-songwriters
Living people
People from Yangon
Burmese people of Rakhine descent
Burmese pop singers